The 2012–13 season was the 87th season in the history of the French football club Chamois Niortais. After finishing as runners-up in the Championnat National in the 2011–12 campaign, the team competed in Ligue 2, the second tier of the French football pyramid. The promotion meant a return to professional status for the club, which was lost following relegation to the Championnat de France amateur three years earlier.

Former Niort midfielder Pascal Gastien continued his second spell as manager, having been appointed to the position in the summer of 2009. The league season began on 27 July 2012 and concluded on 24 May 2013. Niort participated in the Coupe de la Ligue for the first time since 2008, reaching the second round before being eliminated by AS Monaco. The team also entered the Coupe de France in the seventh round along with all the other clubs in Ligue 2, and progressed to the next stage with a 1–0 win against Guéret.

Niort ended the campaign in 15th place in Ligue 2, securing their safety with a 2–0 win at Sedan on 10 May 2013. The highest goalscorers were striker Jérôme Lafourcade and attacking midfielder Jimmy Roye, who each scored eight times.

Transfers
In

Out

Player statistics

Pre-season
Niort returned from the summer break to pre-season training on 25 June. The team travelled to Châteauroux on 1 July to spend a week at the Regional Football Institute. Niort played their first pre-season friendly match on 7 July against LB Châteauroux in Châtellerault. The game ended in a 1–1 draw; new signing Jérôme Lafourcade opened the scoring in the first half before Marcel Essombé equalised for Châteauroux from the penalty spot following a foul by Frédéric Bong. Two trialists made appearances for Niort: defender Tristan Lahaye, who signed for the club permanently two days later, and Burkinabé forward Louckmane Ouédraogo. Meanwhile, five players including new signings Paul Delecroix and Mickaël Courtot were missing through injury and Djibril Konaté was suspended. On 11 July, Niort beat Championnat National side Le Poiré-sur-Vie at the Stade René Gaillard thanks to two goals from Simon Hébras. The visitors pulled a goal back through an Emmanuel Bourgaud penalty after defender Mehdi Khalis fouled former Niort forward Romain Jacuzzi.

In the penultimate warm-up match against fellow Ligue 2 side Tours at the Stade des Champs-de-l'Îsle in Saint-Maixent-l'École, Niort came from behind to draw 1–1. Jérémy Blayac had put Tours ahead in the first half but midfielder Jimmy Juan equalised just before the hour mark to maintain the unbeaten pre-season record. The final friendly game against Le Mans ended in another 1–1 draw; Senegalese international Mouhamadou Diaw equalised from the penalty spot in the second half after Ivorian defender Mamadou Doumbia had given Le Mans the lead on 22 minutes.

Matches

Ligue 2
The Ligue 2 fixtures for the 2012–13 season were released by the LFP on 30 May. Niort were given a home tie against Clermont Foot on 27 July for their opening fixture and will end the season against the same club on 24 May.

League table

Match information

Coupe de France
Niort entered the Coupe de France, the country's major cup competition, in the seventh round along with the other clubs in Ligue 2. In the draw for the seventh round, made on 31 October 2012, the team were drawn to play away against Division d'Honneur (sixth tier) side ES Guérétoise, with the match taking place on 17 November.

Match information

Coupe de la Ligue
The club's return to professional status in 2012 meant that Niort were eligible to compete in the Coupe de la Ligue for the first time since the 2008–09 season. The draws for the first and second rounds of the competition were made on 11 July, and Niort were handed a home game against recently relegated Championnat National side Boulogne in the first round. Niort won 3–2 on penalties after the match finished goalless at the end of extra time. They were subsequently drawn to play fellow Ligue 2 outfit AS Monaco, who also won their tie against Nîmes on penalties, in the second round on 28 August. The match, again at the Stade René Gaillard, ended in a 1–2 defeat for Niort with Mustapha Durak scoring for the home side in front of a season-high crowd of 6,252.

Match information

References

External links
Chamois Niortais official club website

Chamois Niortais F.C. seasons
Chamois Niortais